Teresa A. Dolan is a native of Jersey City, New Jersey.

Dolan retired from the University of Florida College of Dentistry after serving 10 years as dean and 24 years as faculty at the college. In May 2003 she was promoted from interim dean to the new dean of the college.

Dolan first came to the University of Florida in 1989 to begin her career as an assistant professor. Dolan served as an associate director of a joint medicine and dentistry Geriatric Fellowship Program, and as the associate dean for education. She was appointed interim dean in 2002 and dean in 2003.

Education
 Master's degree in public health from the University of California at Los Angeles.
 Doctorate in Dental Surgery from the University of Texas.

See also 

 Women in dentistry in the United States

References

External links
Info on Dolan
Published article written by Dolan

Living people
UCLA School of Public Health alumni
University of Florida faculty
University of Texas alumni
Year of birth missing (living people)
21st-century American women scientists
American dentistry academics
Women dentists
Women deans (academic)
American university and college faculty deans